Mahmudabad (also Romanized as Maḩmūdābād) is a village in Misheh Pareh Rural District, in the Central District of Kaleybar County, East Azerbaijan Province, Iran. At the 2006 census, its population was 100, in 18 families.

References 

Populated places in Kaleybar County